Sweet Relief II: Gravity of the Situation is a 1996 charity record that featured a variety of alternative rock bands covering songs written by quadriplegic musician Vic Chesnutt. Some of the artists were picked to give the album an international appeal to raise more funds for the Sweet Relief Fund, which assists musicians in need of health care.

The album was a sequel to the 1993 compilation Sweet Relief: A Benefit for Victoria Williams and like the earlier release, proceeds went to the Sweet Relief Fund, while Chesnutt received new and widespread public interest. Chesnutt was selected by Victoria Williams as the focus of the second album because "not only is he an unsung talented singer/songwriter... but he represents the plight of a physically handicapped musician who's still out there working".

The album was preceded at alternative rock radio by the release of "Sponge", as performed by R.E.M., while a live music video of Garbage performing "Kick My Ass" was playlisted by VH1.

Track listing 
 Garbage – "Kick My Ass"
 R.E.M. – "Sponge"
 Nanci Griffith with Hootie and the Blowfish – "Gravity of the Situation"
 Soul Asylum – "When I Ran Off and Left Her"
 Dog's Eye View – "Dodge"
 Live – "Supernatural"
 Smashing Pumpkins with Red Red Meat – "Sad Peter Pan"
 Sparklehorse – "West of Rome"
 Joe Henry and Madonna – "Guilty by Association"
 Kristin Hersh – "Panic Pure"
 Cracker – "Withering"
 Indigo Girls – "Free of Hope"
 Mary Margaret O'Hara – "Florida"
 Vic Chesnutt and Victoria Williams – "God Is Good"

"Guilty by Association" 
Joe Henry told Q,  "It turned out quite beautifully, I'm happy to report," he added to Select. "She's quite a good singer if you didn't know. I didn't know."

Comprehensive charts

References

Tribute albums
1996 compilation albums
Charity albums
Alternative rock compilation albums
Sony Music compilation albums
Various artists albums